The Women's National Basketball League (WNBL) presents 7 annual awards and honours to recognise its teams, players, and coaches for their accomplishments. In addition, the team award of the WNBL Championship is awarded to the winner of each season's Grand Final.

Team trophies

Individual awards

Honours

See also

List of National Basketball League (Australia) awards
NBL1 Awards
List of National Basketball League (New Zealand) awards

References

External links

 
Awards
Women's sport-related lists
WNBL